"Ancor che col partire" is a four-voice Italian-language madrigal with music by the Italy-based Flemish composer Cipriano de Rore first published by Antonio Gardano in 1547. The madrigal became de Rore's most popular work, one of the most widely distributed madrigals of the entire 16th Century, and was the basis for further variations, adaptations and ornamentations by many other composers including Antonio de Cabezon, Andrea Gabrieli, and Giovanni Bassano.

Lyrics
The lyrics begin:
Ancor che col partire / Io mi senta morire - Although with leaving you / I feel myself die.

References

Madrigals
1547 works